The 1952 Duke Blue Devils football team represented the Duke Blue Devils of Duke University during the 1952 college football season.

Duke won the 1952 Southern Conference Championship, and finished the season ranked 16th in the final AP poll.

Schedule

References

Duke
Duke Blue Devils football seasons
Southern Conference football champion seasons
Duke Blue Devils football